Nian may refer to:
Nian (年), a Chinese mythological creature
Nian Rebellion, an armed uprising in China, 1851–1868
Nian, Iran (disambiguation), places in Iran
Nian gao (年糕), Chinese food
Nian Gengyao (1679–1726), Chinese military commander
Nian Yun (b. 1982), Chinese Olympic swimmer
Nian Weisi (b. 1933), Chinese association football manager